opened in Shimonoseki, Yamaguchi Prefecture, Japan, in 1995. It is located next to the Ayaragigō Site, a Yayoi settlement that has been designated a national Historic Site.

See also
 List of Historic Sites of Japan (Yamaguchi)
 Yamaguchi Prefectural Museum

References

External links
  Shimonoseki City Archaeological Museum

Museums in Yamaguchi Prefecture
Shimonoseki
Archaeological museums in Japan
Museums established in 1995
1995 establishments in Japan